Anne Walker (born May 21, 1973, New York City) is an architectural historian and author in New York City.

She graduated from the Chapin School, from Middlebury College, and received a master's degree in Historic Preservation from Columbia University. In 2000, she joined Peter Pennoyer Architects in New York City, where she has collaborated with Peter Pennoyer on several books regarding the history of twentieth-century American architecture.

Walker serves as a Fellow Emeritus of the Institute of Classical Architecture and Art.

Books 
 Peter Pennoyer Architects: Apartments, Townhouses, Country Houses, The Vendome Press, 2010.
 The Finest Rooms in America, Rizzoli, 2010, with Thomas Jayne.
 The Ford Plantation Architectural Pattern Book, 1999, co-author, with Donald M. Rattner.
 The Architecture of Delano & Aldrich, W. W. Norton, 2003, co-author, with Peter Pennoyer.
 The Architecture of Warren & Wetmore, W. W. Norton, 2006, co-author, with Peter Pennoyer.
 Frank M. Snyder’s Building Details, W. W. Norton, 2007, co-author, with Peter Pennoyer, of an introduction.
 The Architecture of Grosvenor Atterbury, W. W. Norton, 2009, co-author, with Peter Pennoyer.

Awards 
 Winner, Victorian Society in America's Metropolitan Chapter Annual Publication Award, 2010.
 Winner, Victorian Society in America's Metropolitan Chapter Annual Publication Award, 2007.
 Honorable Mention, American Society of Interior Designers Educational Foundation/Joel Polsky Prize, 2003.

References

External links

 Peter Pennoyer Architects website
 ICA & CA website

1973 births
Middlebury College alumni
Columbia Graduate School of Architecture, Planning and Preservation alumni
Living people
American architectural historians
American women historians
Chapin School (Manhattan) alumni
Historians from New York (state)
American art historians
Women art historians
21st-century American women